"Aries" is a song by British virtual band Gorillaz featuring drummer Georgia and bassist Peter Hook of the bands Joy Division and New Order. The track was released on 9 April 2020 as the third single for Gorillaz' seventh studio album, Song Machine, Season One: Strange Timez. It is part of the Song Machine project, a web series involving the ongoing release of various Gorillaz singles and music videos featuring different guest musicians over the course of 2020.

Music video 
The video, directed by Jamie Hewlett and Tim McCourt, features the band members driving vehicles across a highway landscape in Morocco. 2-D and Murdoc are riding together on a motorcycle, followed by Noodle in a dune buggy (where just prior she is texting someone about 2-D's whereabouts and has grown concerned for him) and finally Russel in a golf kart. Near the end of the video all four of them ride up close to one another. As 2-D continues to sing, Murdoc pulls out a syringe and smiles in a sinister fashion.

On 4 September 2020, Gorillaz released an online driving game based on the "Aries" music video on their website.

Tracklist

Personnel
Gorillaz
 Damon Albarn – vocals, instrumentation, director, guitar, synthesizer
 Jamie Hewlett – artwork, character design, video direction
 Remi Kabaka Jr. – drum programming, percussion, drums

Additional musicians and personnel
 Peter Hook – bass
 Georgia – drums, percussion
 John Davis – mastering engineer
 P2J – drum programming
 James Ford – synthesizers, live drums, percussion, drum programming
 Stephen Sedgwick – mixing engineer, engineering
 Samuel Egglenton – engineering

Charts

References

2019 songs
2020 singles
Gorillaz songs
Songs written by Damon Albarn
Songs written by Peter Hook
Parlophone singles
Warner Records singles
Songs written by Remi Kabaka Jr.
British new wave songs
British psychedelic rock songs
British synth-pop songs
Dance-rock songs
Post-punk songs
Song Machine